Journey to the Sea is a Norwegian drama film from 1966 directed by Arne Skouen, who was also the screenwriter. Skouen's daughter Synne Skouen played Pinne, a teenage girl wanted by the authorities.

Plot
The truck driver Hilmar offers fifteen-year-old Pinne a ride. The girl, who seems frightened and withdrawn, does not say much other than that she wants to go to the sea. At a gas station, Hilmar learns from the radio that Pinne is wanted. She has escaped from the school where she was placed. Hilmar faces a dilemma: whether to call the sheriff or not.

Cast
Erik Bye as Hilmar, the truck driver 
Synne Skouen as Pinne, the wanted teenager
Frimann Falck Clausen as the sheriff
Oddvar Einarson as the boy that finds Pinne's furniture
Bonne Gauguin as Johanne 
Vegard Hall as Niri 
Anne-Vibekke Hansen as a girl
Peter Lindbæk as Biggen 
Egil Lorck as Tønna 
Wenche Medbøe as the curator 
Anne-Lise Tangstad as the supervisor
Carsten Winger as the bartender

References

External links
 
 Reisen til havet at the National Library of Norway
 Reisen til havet at Filmfront

1966 drama films
Norwegian drama films
1960s Norwegian-language films
Norwegian black-and-white films
Films directed by Arne Skouen